De Rooij's bow-fingered gecko (Cyrtodactylus sermowaiensis) is a species of gecko that is endemic to Papua New Guinea.

References 

Cyrtodactylus
Reptiles described in 1915
Taxa named by Nelly de Rooij